Hunefer was a scribe during the 19th Dynasty  (fl. c. 1300 BCE). He was the owner of the Papyrus of Hunefer, a copy of the funerary Egyptian Book of the Dead, which represents one of the classic examples of these texts, along with others such as the Papyrus of Ani.

Hunefer was "Scribe of Divine Offerings", "Overseer of Royal Cattle", and steward of Pharaoh Seti I.

See also
 List of ancient Egyptian scribes

References

External links

 Judgement in the Presence of Osiris, Hunefer's Book of the Dead, Smarthistory
 Papyrus of Hunefer

Ancient Egyptian scribes
13th-century BC works
Ancient Egyptian overseers of the cattle